Splash: Le Grand Plongeon is a French reality television series based on the international series Celebrity Splash! and broadcast on TF1. Only one series was aired.

Season 1 debuted on 8 February 2013 and was hosted by Estelle Denis accompanied by Julie Taton and Gérard Vives with judges Grégory Couratier, Muriel Hermine, Taïg Khris and Laure Manaudou. The trainers were Fanny Aron, Aurélien Bonnaud, Alexis Coquet, Audrey Labeau, Hassan Mouti and Cyrille Oumedjkane. The title was won by swimmer Clément Lefert with rugby player Christian Califano runner-up and handball player Jackson Richardson third.

Although TF1 announced a second season, this never materialized.

French reality television series
2013 French television series debuts